Imre Farkas may refer to:
Imre Farkas de Boldogfa (1811–1876), jurist, landowner, chief magistrate of the district of Zalaegerszeg (főszolgabíró)
Imre Farkas (musician) (1879–1976), Hungarian musician
Imre Farkas (canoeist) (1935–2020), Hungarian Olympic flatwater canoer